Mongolyn Alt (MAK) LLC is a privately owned conglomerate in Mongolia that is involved in gold mining and has expanded into coal and copper mining. It was founded by Nyamtaishir Byambaa in 1993.

Early operations 

In the first decade of its operation, MAK studied the mineral resources of Mongolia and successfully converted certain mineral reserves into profitable businesses. Additionally, MAK has invested in responsible mining practices, as well as in the development of the local economy, environmental sustainability, health, and education sectors. These efforts have contributed significantly to the growth and development of both the Mongolian economy and society.

Over the past decade, MAK has expanded its operations to include processing and manufacturing businesses. Through the establishment of plants that utilize leading technologies such as the "Euro Block Plant," "Euro Cement Plant," and "EuroWindoor Plant," MAK has contributed to reducing Mongolia's dependence on imports and introduced innovation in the construction materials sector. The company has also provided opportunities for Mongolian citizens to work and take pride in their profession and skills, creating a favorable environment for employment.

Timelines 
 1993 - Mongolyn Alt (MAK) LLC was established and began its business operations with the Ikh Galt gold mine
 1995 - MAK founded Bumbat LLC, a Mongolian-Canadian joint venture and became the fourth-largest gold producer in Mongolia
 2000 - MAK diversified its business by starting thermal coal production.
 2002 - Qinghua-MAK Naryn Sukhait LLC, the first Mongolian-Chinese joint venture in the mining sector, was established
 2007 - MAK started its mining operation at Naryn Sukhait Coal Mine
 2010 - The Naryn Sukhait mine produced five million tons of coal.
 2015 - Euro Block Plant was commissioned
 2017 - Euro Cement Plant was commissioned 
 2018 - The Naryn Sukhait Coal Processing Plant was commissioned
 2019 - Euro Windoor Plant was commissioned
 2022 - Euro Venti Plant was commissioned

External links 
 Official website

References 

Mining companies of Mongolia